Mamadou Dembelé (21 January 1934 – 9 October 2016) was a Malian physician and politician. Dembelé served as Prime Minister of Mali from 6 June 1986 to 6 June 1988 under President Moussa Traoré. He was a member of the Democratic Union of the Malian People and responsible for the repression of the 1979–80 student movements. He died on 9 October 2016 at the age of 82. Dembélé was to have a state funeral at the paternal home in Darsalam, followed by interment at the cemetery of Hamdallaye on Tuesday 11 October 2016.

References 

1934 births
2016 deaths
Democratic Union of the Malian People politicians
Prime Ministers of Mali
Malian physicians
21st-century Malian people